"Then It's Love" is a song written by Dennis Linde, and recorded by American country music artist Don Williams.  It was released in October 1986 as the third single from the album New Moves.  The song reached number 3 on the Billboard  Hot Country Singles & Tracks chart.

Charts

Weekly charts

Year-end charts

References

1987 singles
1986 songs
Don Williams songs
Songs written by Dennis Linde
Song recordings produced by Garth Fundis
Capitol Records Nashville singles